Paraplatyptilia inanis is a moth of the family Pterophoridae that is found in Armenia. The species was described by Aristide Caradja in 1920.

References

Moths described in 1920
inanis
Endemic fauna of Armenia
Taxa named by Aristide Caradja